Perry Township may refer to one of the following places in the State of South Dakota:

 Perry Township, Davison County, South Dakota
 Perry Township, Lincoln County, South Dakota

See also

Perry Township (disambiguation)

South Dakota township disambiguation pages